Robert L. Harman (February 10, 1939 – January 9, 2006) was an American sound engineer. He won three Primetime Emmy Awards and was nominated for twenty more in the category Outstanding Sound Mixing. Harman died in January 2006 in Burbank, California, at the age of 66.

References

External links 

1939 births
2006 deaths
People from Los Angeles
American audio engineers
20th-century American engineers
21st-century American engineers
Primetime Emmy Award winners